World's End is a neighbourhood located in Burgess Hill, West Sussex. It is thought that the name arrived with the railway – it was here that the 'up' line met the 'down' line during construction of the Brighton Main Line in what is now the World's End area.

Present day
Currently the area includes its own train station, Wivelsfield railway station, one of the two stations in Burgess Hill.

World's End has a primary school (Manor Field) and a recreation ground. World's End is sometimes known incorrectly as Wivelsfield, the confusion being caused by the name of the station. Wivelsfield is in fact a separate village a few miles to the east of World's End.

References

West Sussex